8th Tactical Squadron(Polish: 8 Eskadra Lotnictwa Taktycznego, 8 ELT)  is a fighter squadron of the Polish Air Force established in 2001. Squadron is stationed in 12th Air Base and operates Su-22 attack aircraft.

References 

Squadrons of the Polish Air Force